Angel Muñoz Suárez, is a Puerto Rican politician affiliated with the New Progressive (PNP). He was elected to the Puerto Rico House of Representatives in 2012 to represent District 18.

References

Living people
New Progressive Party members of the House of Representatives of Puerto Rico
People from Aguada, Puerto Rico
1960 births